Howmeh Rural District (Shahrud County) is a rural district (dehestan) in the Central District of Shahrud County, Semnan Province, Iran. At the 2006 census, its population was 10,008, in 2,806 families. This rural district has 22 villages.

References 

Rural Districts of Semnan Province
Shahrud County